Zhivko Hadzhiev (born 9 November 1994) is a Bulgarian footballer who plays as a defender.

References

External links
 

1994 births
Living people
Bulgarian footballers
First Professional Football League (Bulgaria) players
Neftochimic Burgas players
FC Pomorie players
FC Hebar Pazardzhik players
Association football defenders